Isaac Emmanuel Osei-Bonsu (born 29 August 1924) was a Ghanaian politician who was a member of the first parliament of the second republic of Ghana. He represented Mid-Volta constituency under the membership of the Progress Party (PP).

Early life and education 
Osei-Bonsu was born on 29 August 1924 in the Eastern region of Ghana. He attended Achimota School formerly Prince of Wales College and School, Achimota, later Achimota College, now nicknamed Motown where he obtained his Teachers' Training Certificate. He then proceeded to Fourah Bay College, Mount Aureol, Freetown, Sierra Leone where he obtained his certificate in General Arts Preliminary Studies. He then moved to England to advance his education at Durham University, Durham, United Kingdom where he obtained his Bachelor of Laws degree in law. He was a company director and lawyer before going into politics and becoming a member of parliament.

Politics 
Osei-Bonsu began his political career in 1969 when he became the parliamentary candidate for the Progress Party (PP) to represent Mid-Volta constituency prior to the commencement of the 1969 Ghanaian parliamentary election. He assumed office as a member of the first parliament of the second republic of Ghana on 1 October 1969 after being pronounced winner at the 1969 Ghanaian parliamentary election. His tenure ended on 13 January 1972.

Personal life 
Osei-Bonsu was an Anglican.

References 

1924 births
Possibly living people
Ghanaian MPs 1969–1972
People from Eastern Region (Ghana)
Progress Party (Ghana) politicians